The 2000 Louisiana–Monroe Indians football team represented the University of Louisiana at Monroe as an independent during the 2000 NCAA Division I-A football season. Led by second-year head coach Bobby Keasler, the Indians compiled a record of 1–10. Louisiana–Monroe's offense scored 96 points while the defense allowed 415 points. The team played home games at Malone Stadium in Monroe, Louisiana.

Schedule

References

Louisiana–Monroe
Louisiana–Monroe Warhawks football seasons
Louisiana–Monroe Indians football